Nicky Clarke  (born 17 June 1958) is an English hair stylist and media personality. He initially became famous for styling the hair of various celebrities on several television shows, before earning fame in his own right.

Career
Clarke's interest in hairdressing began when he was a teenager. He started off giving his friends and classmates trims before styling professionally aged just 16. When Clarke was 17, he had his first Vogue shoot in 1976 and soon after founded his first salon with John Frieda on Marylebone Road. In the 1990s, he founded his business with his then girlfriend Lesley turning a £20,000 loan into a successful enterprise. He announced the closure of the salon in April 2022.

He has appeared on several TV shows. In 2002, Clarke was a guest panelist on Will Self's team for an episode of Shooting Stars; his team went on to win that episode. Clarke was also a member of "Team Dec" in Ant & Dec's Saturday Night Takeaway. He appeared on Celebrity Come Dine with Me on Channel 4 on 14 November 2008 and as a judge on the final of Celebrity Scissorhands. In 2011, he took part in ITV series 71 Degrees North but was the first to be eliminated.  In January 2014, he took part in the Channel 4 series The Jump. In 2016, he was a contestant on Pointless Celebrities, the celebrity edition of the British quiz show Pointless, with fellow celebrity hairstylist Lee Stafford.

Clarke received an OBE in February 2008, awarded for 30 years service to the hair-styling industry.

Personal life
Clarke grew up in a working-class family and lived in a council flat in London. His mother was a Greek immigrant who met his father when he was stationed in Greece during the war. In the 1980s, Clarke suffered from a heroin addiction which nearly cost him his life. His then girlfriend, Lesley,  gave him an ultimatum of kicking him out or calling the police if he didn't get off the drugs, prompting him to seek help. Clarke said "It’s my biggest regret, and it horrifies me even now, but I have been in rehab for heroin addiction. It was a very short period of my life and I went in with a small but regular heroin habit that I had for a year. I am sickened when I look back."

Nicky and Lesley have two children but the couple split in 1997 when Nicky had an affair. The pair remain close and continued to work together as business partners. In 2021, Clarke married his long-term partner Kelly Simpkin who he met in 2010 when she was a stylist working for him. The couple have two children together.

References

External links
 

People educated at Archbishop Tenison's Church of England School, Lambeth
British hairdressers
Living people
British people of Greek descent
1958 births
Officers of the Order of the British Empire